World Refrigeration Day is an international day established by the World Refrigeration Day Secretariat in Derbyshire, England. Held annually on 26 June, it was created to raise awareness about the importance of refrigeration technologies in everyday life and to raise the profile of the refrigeration, air-conditioning and heat-pump sector. The day was chosen to celebrate the birth date of Lord Kelvin on 26 June 1824.

History
World Refrigeration Day was the idea of refrigeration consultant Stephen Gill, former president of the Institute of Refrigeration in the UK. In October 2018, ASHRAE (The American Society of Heating, Refrigerating and Air-Conditioning Engineers) pledged support for World Refrigeration Day. In January 2019, ASHRAE awarded Gill it's John F James International Award in Atlanta. In February 2019, the United Nations Environment Programme pledged support at the UNEP national ozone officers meeting in Paris.
The inaugural World Refrigeration Day was held on 26 June 2019.

Annual themes
 2019 - Diversity; diversity of applications, people, careers, locations, technology, science, engineered solutions, and innovation.
 2020 - The Cold Chain; role of the Cold chain sector in food safety and security, and human health.
 2021 - Careers; aimed at students and young professionals.
 2022 - Cooling; raise awareness of the benefits and impacts of cooling, and technology solutions for sustainability.

References

External links
 World Refrigeration Day official web site

International observances
June observances
Heating, ventilation, and air conditioning
Cooling technology
Awareness days
Recurring events established in 2019